KXMS (88.7 FM) is a radio station broadcasting a classical music format. Licensed to Joplin, Missouri, United States, the station serves the Joplin area.  The station is currently owned by Board of Governors of Missouri Southern State University.

References

External links

XMS
Classical music radio stations in the United States